Canford Heath is a ward in Poole, Dorset. Since 2019, the ward has elected 3 councillors to Bournemouth, Christchurch and Poole Council.

History 
The Canford Heath area was formerly part of two wards on Poole Borough Council; Canford Heath East and Canford Heath West.

Geography 
The ward covers the suburb of Canford Heath.

Councillors

Canford Heath 
The ward is currently represented by three Liberal Democrat councillors. Due to the death of Pete Parish in 2020, a by-election was held in 2021 (delayed due to the COVID-19 Pandemic), which Sean Gabriel of the Conservative Party won.

Former wards

Canford Heath East

Canford Heath West

Election results

2021 by-election 
The statement of persons nominated was revealed on 9 April 2021: On 8 April 2021 the Green Party announced their candidate.

The turnout was 31.96 per cent; and former Mayor of Poole Sean Gabriel was elected.

2019

2000

References 

Wards of Bournemouth, Christchurch and Poole
Politics of Poole